Bhubaneswar–Junagarh Express is an Express train belonging to Indian Railways that runs between  and  as a daily service. Although both termini are in the state of Odisha, it has an intermediate stop at Vizianagaram in Andhra Pradesh. It is maintained by East Coast Railway zone. It operates as train number 18437 from Bhubaneswar to Junagarh and as train number 18438 in the reverse direction.

History
Bhawanipatna–Bhubaneshwar link express started from Bhawanipatna on 11 August 2012. Later it was extended to Junagarh on 2 March 2014. It was the first train connecting to Bhawanipatna railway station.

Coaches

It consists of one combined 2AC and 3AC, one 3AC, four sleeper, two general second and two guard cum luggage vans. The total composition is 10 coaches.

References

Express trains in India
Railway services introduced in 2012
Transport in Bhubaneswar
Rail transport in Odisha